Le Rubli (or Rüeblihorn) is a 2,285 metre high mountain in the western Bernese Alps, overlooking Rougemont in the canton of Vaud, near the border with the canton of Berne. Le Rubli has steep faces and its summit is relatively difficult to access. A via ferrata starts near the gondola station of the Videmanette (2,160 m).

A cable car travels its western face.

References

External links
Le Rubli on Hikr
La Vidémanette – Gstaad Dolomites - MySwitzerland.com
Rougemont - a via ferrata for all iron route enthusiasts - MySwitzerland.com

Mountains of the Alps
Mountains of Switzerland
Bernese Alps
Mountains of the canton of Vaud